The 2013 Tilia Slovenia Open is a professional tennis tournament played on hard courts. It was the 1st edition of the tournament which was part of the 2013 ATP Challenger Tour. It took place in Portorož, Slovenia between 1 and 7 July 2013.

Singles main-draw entrants

Seeds

 1 Rankings are as of June 25, 2013.

Other entrants
The following players received wildcards into the singles main draw:

  Tom Kočevar-Dešman
  Stepan Khotulev
  Marko Lazič
  Mike Urbanija

The following players received entry from the qualifying draw:
  Erik Crepaldi
  Frank Dancevic
  Nik Razboršek
  Filip Veger

The following player received entry as a lucky loser:
  Toni Androić
  Egor Gerasimov

Doubles main-draw entrants

Seeds

1 Rankings as of June 25, 2013.

Other entrants
The following pairs received wildcards into the doubles main draw:
  Tom Kočevar-Dešman /  Mike Urbanija
  Gregor Breskvar /  Jaka Kaplja
  Miha Mlakar /  Tilen Žitnik

The following pair received entry as an alternate:
  André Ghem /  Sander Groen

Champions

Singles

 Grega Žemlja def.  Martin Fischer 6–4, 7–5

Doubles

 Marin Draganja /  Mate Pavić def.  Aljaž Bedene /  Blaž Rola 6–3, 1–6, [10–5]

External links
Official Website

Tilia Slovenia Open
Tilia Slovenia Open
2013 in Slovenian tennis